The 2015–16 Coppa Titano were the 58th season in the cup's history. The tournament began on 15 September 2015 and ended on 1 May 2016.

La Fiorita won the tournament and qualified for the Europa League.

Format
The format of the cup changed from previous years. The fifteen teams from San Marino were drawn into four groups. The winners and runners-up in each group advance to the knockout stage.

Group stage
Each team played a total of six matches against the teams in their group. In groups A, B, and C teams played each other twice. In group D teams played each other three times. The top two from each group advance to the Knockout stage.

Group A

Group B

Group C

Group D

Matches 1–4

Matches 5–6

Knockout stage
The knockout stage involved the eight teams that qualified as winners and runners-up of each of the four groups in the group stage.

All matches were decided over one leg with extra time and then penalties used to break ties.

In the quarter-finals, teams from the same group could not be drawn against each other. In the draws for the semi-finals all teams could be drawn against each other. In all rounds, home team was decided in the draw.

The draw was announced on 8 April 2016, with the entire knockout stage being known.

Qualified teams

Bracket

Quarter-finals
This round involved all eight teams that qualified for the knockout stage.

Semi-finals
This round involved the four teams that advance from the quarter-finals.

Final
The semi-final winners competed in one match to be the cup winner.

Winners, La Fiorita, earned a spot in the 2016–17 Europa League first qualifying round.

References

External links
 official site (Italian)
 uefa.com

Coppa Titano seasons
San Marino
Coppa Titano